The Murrumbidgee River is a major tributary of the Murray River within the Murray–Darling basin and the second longest river in Australia.

The word Murrumbidgee or Marrmabidya means "big water" in the Wiradjuri language, one of the local Australian Aboriginal languages. The river itself flows through several traditional Aboriginal Australian lands, home to various Aboriginal peoples. In the Australian Capital Territory, the river is bordered by a narrow strip of land on each side; these are managed as the Murrumbidgee River Corridor (MRC). This land includes many nature reserves, eight recreation reserves, a European heritage conservation zone and rural leases.

Flow 
From its headwaters it flows to its confluence with the Murray River. The river flows for  through the Australian Capital Territory near Canberra, picking up the important tributaries of the Gudgenby, Queanbeyan, Molonglo and Cotter Rivers. The Murrumbidgee drains much of southern New South Wales and all of the Australian Capital Territory, and is an important source of irrigation water for the Riverina farming area.

The reaches of the Murrumbidgee in the Australian Capital Territory (ACT) are affected by the complete elimination of large spring snow melt flows and a reduction of average annual flows of almost 50%, due to Tantangara Dam. Tantangara Dam was completed in 1960 on the headwaters of Murrumbidgee River and diverts approximately 99% of the river's flow at that point into Lake Eucumbene. This has extremely serious effects on native fish populations and other native aquatic life and has led to serious siltation, stream contraction, fish habitat loss and other problems.  The Murrumbidgee where it enters the ACT is effectively half the river it used to be.

A study suggests a section of the upper river's channels are relatively new in geological terms, dating from the early Miocene (the Miocene era being from 23 to 5 million years ago). It is suggested that the Upper Murrumbidgee is an anabranch of the Tumut River (that once continued north along Mutta Mutta Creek) when geological uplift near Adaminaby diverted its flow.  From Gundagai onwards the rivers flow within its ancestral channel.

In June 2008 the Murray-Darling Basin Commission released a report on the condition of the Murray-Darling basin, with the Goulburn and Murrumbidgee Rivers rated in a very poor condition in the Murray-Darling basin with fish stocks in both rivers were also rated as extremely poor, with only 13 of the original 22 native fish species still found in the Murrumbidgee River.

History 
The Murrumbidgee River runs through the traditional lands of the Ngarigo, Ngunnawal, Wiradjuri, Nari Nari and Muthi Muthi Aboriginal peoples.

Exploration 

The Murrumbidgee River was known to Europeans before it was first recorded by them.  In 1820 the explorer Charles Throsby informed the Governor of New South Wales that he anticipated finding "a considerable river of salt water (except at very wet seasons), called by the natives Mur-rum-big-gee". In the expedition journal, Throsby wrote as a marginal note: "This river or stream is called by the natives Yeal-am-bid-gie ...". The river he had stumbled upon was in fact the Molonglo River, Throsby reached the actual river in April 1821.

In 1823, Brigade-Major John Ovens and Captain Mark Currie reached the upper Murrumbidgee when exploring south of Lake George. In 1829, Charles Sturt and his party rowed down the lower half of the Murrumbidgee River in a stoutly built, large row-boat, from Narrandera to the Murray River, and then down the Murray River to the sea. They then rowed back upstream, against the current, to their starting point. Sturt's description of their passage through the junction of the Murrumbidgee and Murray Rivers is dramatic. His description of wild strong currents in the Murrumbidgee—in the middle of summer (14 January 1830), when flows are declining and close to the seasonal summer/autumn minimum, are in contrast to the reduced flow seen at the junction today in mid-summer:

The men looked anxiously out ahead; for the singular change in the river had impressed on them an idea, that we were approaching its termination ... We were carried at a fearful rate down its gloomy and contracted banks ... At 3 p.m., Hopkinson called out that we were approaching a junction, and in less than a minute afterwards, we were hurried into a broad and noble river ... such was the force with which we had been shot out of the Morumbidgee, that we were carried nearly to the bank opposite its embouchure, whilst we continued to gaze in silent astonishment on the capacious channel [of the Murray River] we had entered ...

The Murrumbidgee basin was opened to settlement in the 1830s and soon became an important farming area.

Ernest Favenc, when writing on Australian exploration, commented on the relatively tardy European discovery of the river and that the river retained a name used by Indigenous Australians:

Here we may remark on the tenacity with which the Murrumbidgee River long eluded the eye of the white man. It is scarcely probable that Meehan and Hume, who on this occasion were within comparatively easy reach of the head waters, could have seen a new inland river at that time without mentioning the fact, but there is no record traceable anywhere as to the date of its discovery, or the name of its finder. When in 1823 Captain Currie and Major Ovens were led along its bank on to the beautiful Maneroo country by Joseph Wild, the stream was then familiar to the early settlers and called the Morumbidgee. Even in 1821, when Hume found the Yass Plains, almost on its bank, he makes no special mention of the river. From all this we may deduce the extremely probable fact that the position of the river was shown to some stockrider by a native, who also confided the aboriginal name, and so it gradually worked the knowledge of its identity into general belief. This theory is the more feasible as the river has retained its native name. If a white man of any known position had made the discovery, it would at once have received the name of some person holding official sway.

Navigation 
The river was once used as a transport route, with paddle steamers navigating the river as far as Gundagai. The river trade declined with the coming of the railways. Paddle steamers last used the Murrumbidgee in the 1930s. To allow the steamers and towed barges to pass, there were opening bridges at Hay , Balranald, and Carathool

Floods 

The river has risen above  at Gundagai nine times between 1852 and 2010, an average of just under once every eleven years. The construction of Burrinjuck Dam from 1907 has significantly reduced flooding but, despite the dam, there were major floods in 1925, 1950, 1974 and 2012.

The most notable flood was in 1852 when the town of Gundagai was swept away and 89 people, a third of the town's population, were killed.  The town was rebuilt on higher ground.

In 1925, four people died and the flooding lasted for eight days.

The reduction in floods has consequences for wildlife, particularly birds and trees.  There has been a decline in bird populations and black box flood plain eucalypt forest trees are starting to lose their crowns.

Wetlands 
Major wetlands along the Murrumbidgee or associated with the Murrumbidgee catchment include:
 Lowbidgee Floodplain,  between Maude and Balranald
 Mid-Murrumbidgee Wetlands along the river from Narrandera to Carathool
 Fivebough and Tuckerbil Swamps
 Tomneys Plain
 Micalong Swamp
 Lake George
 Yaouk Swamp
 Black Swamp & Coopers Swamp
 Big Badja Swamp

Tributaries 

The Murrumbidgee River has about 90 named tributaries in total; 24 rivers, and numerous creeks and gullies. The ordering of the basin, from source to mouth, of the major tributaries is:

Population centres 
 Tharwa
 Canberra particularly Tuggeranong
 Jugiong
 Gundagai
 Wantabadgery
 Wagga Wagga
 Narrandera
 Yanco
 Leeton
 Darlington Point
 Hay
 Balranald

River crossings 
The list below notes past and present bridges that cross over the Murrumbidgee River.  There were numerous other crossings before the bridges were constructed and many of these still exist today.

Downstream from Wagga Wagga

Wagga Wagga to Burrinjuck

Upstream from Burrinjuck

Images

Distances along the river 
 Gundagai to Wagga Wagga – 
 Wagga Wagga to Yarragundy – 
 Yarragundy to Yiorkibitto – 
 Yiorkibitto to Grong Grong – 
 Grong Grong to Narrandera – 
 Narrandera to Yanco or Bedithera – 
 Yanco to Yanco Station – 
 Yanco to Gogeldrie – 
 Gogeldrie to Tubbo – 
 Tubbo to Cararburry – 
 Cararbury to Carrathool – 
 Carrathool to Burrabogie – 
 Burrabogie to Illilliwa – 
 Illilliwa to Hay – 
 Hay to Toogambie – 
 Toogambie to Maude – 
 Maude to Lachlan Junction – 
 Lachlan Junction to Balranald – 
 Balranald to Canally – 
 Canally to Weimby, Murray Junction – 
 Total distance from Gundagai to Murrumbidgee Junction –

See also

 
 
 List of Murrumbidgee River distances
 List of Darling River distances
 List of Murray River crossings
 List of Murray River distances
 Murray–Darling basin includes useful chart of tributaries

References

External links 

Nomination of Lower Murrumbidgee Catchment for UNESCO's HELP Pilot Demonstration Status by CSIRO
Murrumbidgee River Flows recorded by NSW Water
River pilot maps 1880-1918 / Echuca Historical Society
Snowy  Flow Response Monitoring and Modelling
Murrumbidgee Catchment Management Authority website
Upper Murrumbidgee Demonstration Reach  1.22MB
 
 

 
Rivers of New South Wales
Rivers of the Australian Capital Territory
Tributaries of the Murray River
Newell Highway
Rivers in the Riverina
Snowy Mountains Scheme